Dr. Martin Luther King Jr. is a 1998 public art work designed by American artist Erik Blome, located in downtown Milwaukee, Wisconsin.  The bronze sculpture depicts the civil rights movement leader Martin Luther King Jr. standing on a pedestal of books. It was commissioned by the YWCA of Greater Milwaukee and is located in front of the King Heights apartments.

See also
 Children of the West End
 Civil rights movement in popular culture
 Martin Luther King Jr. (Wilson sculpture), Washington, D.C.
 Statue of Martin Luther King Jr. (Austin, Texas)
 Statue of Martin Luther King Jr. (Houston)

References

External links

 Artist's page on this Martin Luther King Jr. statue
 Artist's page on another statue by the same name in Rocky Mount, North Carolina

1998 establishments in Wisconsin
1998 sculptures
Bronze sculptures in Wisconsin
Memorials to Martin Luther King Jr.
Outdoor sculptures in Milwaukee
Sculptures of Martin Luther King Jr.
Sculptures of men in Wisconsin
Statues in Wisconsin
Books in art